In Sunlight and in Shadow is a novel by Mark Helprin published in 2012 by Houghton Mifflin Harcourt.

Plot
It is set in New York City and often waxes lyrical about the city itself. It is the story of the love affair between Jewish business heir and former soldier, Harry Copeland, and Catherine Thomas Hale, also known by her stage name of Catherine Sedley, daughter of a wealthy, blue-blood New York family, from the time of their meeting on a Staten Island ferry.

Similar works
Of all Helprin's works, this one is most similar to A Soldier of the Great War.

References

External links
 
 

2012 American novels
Novels by Mark Helprin
Novels set in New York City
Houghton Mifflin books